Witham Charterhouse, also Witham Priory,  at Witham Friary, Somerset, was established in 1178/79, the earliest of the ten medieval Carthusian houses (charterhouses) in England. It was suppressed in the Dissolution of the Monasteries in 1539.

History
The charterhouse was founded by Henry II in his Royal Forest of Selwood, as part of his penance for the murder of Archbishop Thomas Becket of Canterbury and was established at Witham Friary, Somerset, in 1178/1179 by a founding party led by a monk called Narbert from the Grande Chartreuse. Hugh of Avalon (later Saint Hugh) was made prior of Witham Charterhouse in 1180.

The house was suppressed as part of the dissolution of the monasteries on 15 March 1539.

The lay brothers' church is now used as the parish church of Witham Friary.

Archaeology 
In 1921 excavations revealed buttressed wall foundations and building rubble including glazed roof tiles and floor tiles. Later work in 1965 and 1968 revealed further buildings, two of which were interpreted as the chapter house and possibly a church.

Remains

The site of the charterhouse is marked by extensive rectilinear earthworks, cut by a railway line, and some worked stone can still be seen in buildings in the village of Witham Friary. The remains of the original monastic fishponds still survive to the east of the site.

References 

Archaeological sites in Somerset
Buildings and structures in Mendip District
Carthusian monasteries in England
Christian monasteries established in the 12th century
Church of England church buildings in Mendip District
Monasteries dissolved under the English Reformation
Monasteries in Somerset
Ruined abbeys and monasteries
Ruins in Somerset
Scheduled monuments in Mendip District
1178 establishments in England
1539 disestablishments in England